The Research Institute of Molecular Pathology (IMP) is a biomedical research center, which conducts curiosity-driven basic research in the molecular life sciences.

The IMP is located at the Vienna Biocenter in Vienna, Austria. The institute employs around 270 people from 40 countries, of which over 200 are scientists. The working language at the IMP is English. The IMP was established in 1985 and is funded by the pharmaceutical company Boehringer Ingelheim and research grants.

Research

IMP comprises 15 independent research groups performing basic biological research across the following areas:
 molecular and cellular biology;
 structural biology and biochemistry;
 gene expression and chromosome biology;
 stem cell biology and development;
 immunology and cancer;
 neuroscience.

Publications, awards and honours
Scientists at the IMP publish 60 to 90 papers in international peer-review journals per year: between 1985 and 2021, more than 2,200 research papers were published. 93 patents were filed based on discoveries made at the institute since 1985. IMP faculty was awarded 17 ERC Grants since the establishment of this grant scheme in 2007; about two thirds of the IMP faculty were ERC grantees by 2018. Five IMP faculty members received Wittgenstein Awards since 1996. About one third of the faculty are elected members of EMBO. In 2017, Kim Nasmyth received the Breakthrough Prize in life sciences for work on cohesin that he had done at the IMP. One year later, his former IMP PhD student Angelika Amon was awarded the same prize.

Facilities
IMP maintains a suite of in-house facilities, maintained in cooperation with IMBA, that provide support and scientific services to the scientists at IMP. In addition, the four research institutes of the Vienna Biocenter maintain a number of shared services jointly called "Vienna BioCenter Core Facilities" (VBCF). The services offered are available to all Vienna BioCenter scientists including IMP staff.

History
The establishment of the IMP was a joint venture by Boehringer Ingelheim and Genentech and initiated in 1985. Under the directorship of Max Birnstiel, the first institute building was opened in 1988.

In 1992, three institutes of the faculties of science and medicine of the University of Vienna moved into a nearby building, today's Max Perutz Labs. This created the basis for referring to the area as the "Vienna Biocenter".

In 1993, Boehringer Ingelheim took over the IMP shares of Genentech. Following Max Birnstiel's retirement in 1997, Kim Nasmyth became scientific director.

In 2006, two institutes of the Austrian Academy of Sciences were opened in the vicinity of the IMP: the Institute of Molecular Biotechnology (IMBA) and the Gregor Mendel Institute (GMI). The three institutes cooperate closely by maintaining shared facilities. In the same year, Barry Dickson became the IMP's scientific director.

Since 2013, Jan-Michael Peters is scientific director of the IMP. In late 2016, the IMP moved into its new building, which was formally opened on 1 March 2017.

PhD program
The "Vienna BioCenter PhD Program" is an international PhD training program carried out jointly by the four Vienna Biocenter research institutes. Acceptance into the program is competitive and based on a formal selection procedure. There are two selections each year, deadlines are April 30 and November 15. Participation in the program is a condition for doing a PhD at the IMP.

Building

The current IMP building at Campus-Vienna-Biocenter 1 was opened in 2017. It comprises 15,000 square meters of gross floor space and 8,000 square meters of net area, spread over eight levels.

The building contains 3,000 square meters for laboratories and 2,000 square meters for offices; its lecture hall seats up to 280 people. The buildings has six seminar rooms and technical facilities. Some facilities such as cafeteria, but also scientific services, are open to staff from other Vienna Biocenter entities and the IMP building is connected to the neighboring Institute of Molecular Biotechnology building through a bridge.

Several features of the building refer to biological research: the facade features stripes should resemble DNA bands as seen in gel electrophoresis; the central elevator's glass covers are coated with dichroic foils which are also used in filters for light microscopy. The project costs of 52 million Euros were born by the IMP's main sponsor Boehringer Ingelheim.

Scientific Advisory Board
In order to maintain a high standard of research, the IMP employs a process of continuous review and feedback. The Scientific Advisory Board (SAB), consisting of distinguished scientists, meets once a year and discusses the quality, significance, and main focus of research conducted at the IMP. The SAB is chaired by Dirk Schübeler of Friedrich Miescher Institute. Its other members are Adrian Bird (University of Edinburgh); Hans Clevers (Hubrecht Institute); Michael Hausser (University College London); Norbert Kraut (Boehringer Ingelheim); Ruth Lehmann (New York University); Ruslan Medzhitov (Yale School of Medicine/HHMI); Tom Rapoport (Harvard Medical School).

Funding
The operating budget of the IMP is provided largely by Boehringer Ingelheim. Support comes from grants awarded to individual scientists and projects by national and international funding agencies such as the Austrian Science Fund (FWF), Austrian Industrial Research Promotion Fund (FFG), the Vienna Science and Technology Fund (WWTF), Zentrum für Innovation und Technologie (ZIT), the City of Vienna, the Austrian federal government, the Human Frontier Science Program (HFSP), and the European Union (EU).

Notable people

Group leaders and research areas
 Meinrad Busslinger: Stem cell commitment in haematopoiesis
 Tim Clausen: molecular mechanisms of protein quality control
 Andrea Pauli: molecular mechanisms of fertilization
 Jan-Michael Peters: mitosis and chromosome biology
 Alexander Stark: systems biology of regulatory motifs and networks – towards understanding gene expression from the DNA sequence
 Elly Tanaka: molecular mechanisms of vertebrate regeneration

Alumni
 Angelika Amon, master student/PhD student, 1989-1993
 Denise Barlow, group leader, 1988-1996
 Hartmut Beug, senior scientist 1988-2010
 Adrian Bird, senior scientist 1987-1990
 Max Birnstiel, managing director 1989-1996
 Barry Dickson, group leader 1998-2002; managing director 2006-2012
 Thomas Jenuwein, group leader/senior scientist 1993-2008
 David Keays: microtubules and magnetoreception
 Kim Nasmyth, senior scientist/managing director 1989-2003
 Giulio Superti-Furga, PhD student 1988-1990
 Frank Uhlmann, postdoc 1997-2000
 Erwin Wagner, senior scientist/deputy director 1988-2008
 Martin Zenke, group leader 1988-1995

References

External links

 

Pathology organizations
Biochemistry research institutes
Biological research institutes
Medical research institutes in Austria
Research institutes established in 1985
Education in Vienna
1985 establishments in Austria